The 1908 Fairmount Wheatshockers football team was an American football team that represented Fairmount College (now known as Wichita State University) as an independent during the 1908 college football season. In its fourth season under head coach Willis Bates, the team compiled an 8–1 record and outscored opponents by a total of 256 to 32.  Its only loss was to Oklahoma.

Schedule

References

Fairmount
Wichita State Shockers football seasons
Fairmount Wheatshockers football